Simon Ostrach (December 26, 1923 – October 2, 2017) was an American academic and a pioneer in the fields of buoyancy-driven flows and microgravity science.

Early life and education 
Ostrach was born and raised in Providence, Rhode Island. He earned a Bachelor of Science and Master of Science in Engineering from Rhode Island State College, followed by an additional Master of Science and a PhD from Brown University, both in Applied Mathematics.

Career 
He was a Distinguished Professor at Florida State University, where he was affiliated with the Florida A&M University – Florida State University College of Engineering. He was also the Wilbert J. Austin Distinguished Professor Emeritus of Engineering at Case Western Reserve University in Cleveland, Ohio. He was honored by NASA in 1998 as one of its "12 Superstars of Modern Aeronautics" and was a member of the National Academy of Engineering and the American Academy of Arts & Sciences.

Personal life 
Ostrach was married twice and had five children. One of his sons, Louis Ostrach, died in 2017.

He died at the age of 93 in Pepper Pike, Ohio.

References

External links
 Florida State University faculty profile
 Case Western Reserve University Mechanical and Aerospace Engineering Faculty

1923 births
2017 deaths
Engineering educators
Florida State University faculty
Fellows of the American Academy of Arts and Sciences
Case Western Reserve University faculty
Fluid dynamicists
Members of the United States National Academy of Engineering
American engineers
Brown University alumni
University of Rhode Island alumni
People from Providence, Rhode Island